The Desert Star Weekly (formerly the Desert Valley Star) is a community newspaper covering local news, government, arts and entertainment in the Palm Springs area of California.

The business is located and published in Desert Hot Springs, California as a weekly newspaper.

In 2008 the Desert Valley Star was started as an online newsroom. Later that year it became a newsprint tabloid which soon merged with the American Free Journal, a newsprint tabloid that had been published since 1989. The business was located in Yucca Valley and the product circulated in the High Desert of San Bernardino and Riverside Counties, but in 2009 the business relocated to Desert Hot Springs. Until 2010 it was published as two products; later that year the American Free Journal brand was dropped in order to focus on one exclusive product and the name became the Desert Star Weekly.

In April 2013 the business was sold to CommunityMedia of Orange County.

Publication details
Newspapers are distributed each Thursday. The Desert Star Weekly is a community paper. The site includes story web pages plus a page-flipper that mimic the printed product.

The paper circulates in the cities and communities of Desert Hot Springs, Palm Springs, Cathedral City, Rancho Mirage, Thousand Palms, Palm Desert, Indian Wells, La Quinta, Indio, Coachella and Sky Valley, Morongo Valley, Yucca Valley, Joshua Tree, Twentynine Palms, Landers and Lucerne Valley.

References

External links
 Desert Star Weekly website

Weekly newspapers published in California
Mass media in Riverside County, California
Companies based in Riverside County, California
Desert Hot Springs, California